Fausto Malari or Fausto Molari or Fausto Mellari (died 1608) was a Roman Catholic prelate who served as Bishop of Chiusi (1602–1608).

Biography
Malari was a native of Siena.

He is attested as Vicar General of the Archbishop of Siena in 1592 and again in 1596.

On 22 April 1602, Fausto Malari was appointed Bishop of Chiusi by Pope Clement VIII.
On 5 May 1602, he was consecrated bishop by Camillo Borghese, Cardinal-Priest of San Crisogono, with Guglielmo Bastoni, Bishop of Pavia, and Horace Capponi, Bishop of Carpentras, serving as co-consecrators. 
He served as Bishop of Chiusi until his death in 1608.

References

External links
 (for Chronology of Bishops) 
 (for Chronology of Bishops) 

17th-century Italian Roman Catholic bishops
Bishops appointed by Pope Clement VIII
Date of birth unknown
1608 deaths
Bishops of Chiusi